ReMastered: The Two Killings of Sam Cooke is a 2019 documentary film about Sam Cooke, the artist and activist, and the circumstances and controversy surrounding his murder.

Premise
On December 11, 1964, at the age of 33, Cooke was shot and killed by Bertha Franklin, the manager of the Hacienda Motel in Los Angeles, California. ReMastered: The Two Killings of Sam Cooke explores the mystery behind the murder through interviews with family, friends, journalists and academics as well as archival footage.

Cast
 Sam Cooke
 Quincy Jones
 Smokey Robinson
 Dionne Warwick
 Lou Adler
 Al Schmitt
 Jerry Brandt
 Jim Brown
 Marjorie Cook
 Billy Davis
Kevin Powell
 Joan Dew
 Norman Edelen
 Renee Graham
 Erik Greene
 Jason King
 Spencer Leak

References

External links

 
 
 

2019 documentary films
2019 films
Netflix original documentary films
2010s English-language films